The Louise Home Hospital and Residence Hall is an historic hospital and residence hall in Gresham, Oregon, United States. Built in 1925, it originally served as a place of residence for unwed and pregnant mothers. It also housed the disabled, and served as a women's educational institution. The hospital and its surrounding  campus—surrounded by Douglas fir trees—is listed on the National Register of Historic Places. 

Contemporarily, it is the headquarters of the Albertina Kerr Centers for Children, a mental health institution in the Portland metropolitan area.

History
The original Louise Home was established in the Goose Hollow neighborhood of Portland, Oregon by William G. McLaren, who wanted to create awareness for unwed mothers. The home is believed to have taken its name from the house's first donor, or that of the sellers of the original home. The organization was run by Albertina Kerr. Kerr died of typhus in 1911, after which her husband Alexander donated the home to the Pacific Coast Rescue and Protective Society. 

The Louise Home Hospital and Residence Hall was built in 1925 on a  plot of land in Gresham due to an increased need for boarding and medical care for unwed pregnant women, single mothers, and children. The Louise Home was the center of the campus, housing unwed young women, though additional buildings served as the Albertina Kerr Nursery and the Wynne Watts School, an educational institute for women. The Louise Home had its own self-sustaining farm that provided meat, dairy products, eggs, fruit, and vegetables for the residents.

See also
National Register of Historic Places listings in Multnomah County, Oregon

References

External links

Historical timeline of the Albertina Kerr Foundation

1925 establishments in Oregon
Buildings and structures in Multnomah County, Oregon
Infrastructure completed in 1925
Georgian Revival architecture in Oregon
Buildings and structures in Gresham, Oregon
History of Gresham, Oregon
History of Portland, Oregon
Hospital buildings on the National Register of Historic Places in Oregon
Defunct hospitals in Oregon
National Register of Historic Places in Gresham, Oregon
Women's health in the United States
Women's shelters in the United States
Women in Oregon